Freddy's Narrow Escape is a 1916 silent film comedy short directed by Frank Currier. It was produced by the Vitagraph Company of America and distributed by General Film Company.

Cast
William Dangman - Freddy
Helen Gurney - Aunt Maria
Daisy Devere - Rose Green
Frank Currier - Judge Green
Wilfred Lytell - The Minister (*as Wilfred Lytell Jr.)

References

External links
Freddy's Narrow Escape
lobby poster

1916 short films
American black-and-white films
Silent American comedy films
1916 comedy films
American silent short films
1916 films
1910s American films